GroovyRoom (Hangul: 그루비룸) is a South Korean DJ, music producing and composing duo consisting of Park Gyu-jeong and Lee Hwi-min. They mainly produce hip-hop songs such as boom bap and trap. The songs they produce have a producer tag called "Groovy Everywhere".

GroovyRoom released their debut single "Loyalty" in 2016 and their first EP Everywhere in 2017. In 2019, they released their first collaboration project album with Ambition Musik's Leellamarz titled Room Service. They have received several music awards including Producer of the Year at the Korean Hip-hop Awards and Best Hip-hop Maker Award at the Soribada Best K-Music Awards.

In March 2021, the duo announced they had launched AREA, a new label in partnership with their current label H1ghr Music. They have signed singer Gemini and rapper Mirani.

Member

Discography

Extended plays

Singles

Other charted songs

Production discography

Filmography

Television

Awards and nominations

Notes

References

South Korean record producers
South Korean musical duos